The City of Cape Town (Cape Town metropolitan area) like most South African metropolitan areas, uses Metropolitan or "M" routes for important intra-city routes, a layer below National (N) roads and Regional (R) roads. Each city's M roads are independently numbered.

Table of M roads

See also 
 Numbered Routes in South Africa

References

Google Maps
Google Streetview
OpenStreetMap
 MapStudio Street Guide: Cape Town including Western Cape Towns (2013)

Roads in South Africa
Roads in Cape Town